Kashiwagi (written: 柏木) is a Japanese surname. Notable people with the surname include:

, Japanese businessman
Dean T. Kashiwagi, an American academic
Hiroaki Kashiwagi (born 1982), Japanese curler
Hiroshi Kashiwagi (1922–2019), Japanese-American poet, playwright and actor
, Japanese alpine skier
, Japanese basketball player
Soji Kashiwagi (born 1962), American journalist and playwright
, Japanese footballer
, Japanese idol and singer
, Japanese actress

Japanese-language surnames